is a passenger railway station  located in the city of  Takarazuka Hyōgo Prefecture, Japan. It is operated by the private transportation company Hankyu Railway.

Lines

Layout
The station consists of two opposed side platforms, connected by an underground passage.

Platforms

Adjacent stations

History
Kiyoshikōjin station opened on March 10, 1910, the day the Takarazuka Line started operation.

Passenger statistics
In fiscal 2019, the station was used by an average of 8,245 passengers daily

Surrounding area
Kiyoshikōjin Seichō-ji
 Takarazuka City Central Library

See also
List of railway stations in Japan

References

External links

Kiyoshikōjin Station (Hankyu Railway) 

Railway stations in Hyōgo Prefecture
Hankyu Railway Takarazuka Line
Stations of Hankyu Railway
Railway stations in Japan opened in 1910
Takarazuka, Hyōgo